Self-control, an aspect of inhibitory control, is the ability to regulate one's emotions, thoughts, and behavior in the face of temptations and impulses. As an executive function, it is a cognitive process that is necessary for regulating one's behavior in order to achieve specific goals.

A related concept in psychology is emotional self-regulation. Self-control is thought to be like a muscle. According to studies, self-regulation, whether emotional or behavioral, was proven to be a limited resource which functions like energy. In the short term, overuse of self-control will lead to depletion. However, in the long term, the use of self-control can strengthen and improve over time.

Self-control is also a key concept in the general theory of crime, a major theory in criminology. The theory was developed by Michael Gottfredson and Travis Hirschi in their book titled A General Theory of Crime, published in 1990. Gottfredson and Hirschi define self-control as the differential tendency of individuals to avoid criminal acts independent of the situations in which they find themselves. Individuals with low self-control tend to be impulsive, insensitive towards others, risk takers, short-sighted, and nonverbal. About 70% of the variance in questionnaire data operationalizing one construct of self-control had been found to be genetic.

As a virtue
Temperance, or sophrosyne, has been described as a virtue by philosophers and religious thinkers, from Plato and Aristotle to the present day, and more recently by psychologists, particularly in the positive psychology movement.

Research

Counteractive

Desire is an affectively charged motivation toward a certain object, person, or activity, but not limited to, that associated with pleasure or relief from displeasure. Desires vary in strength and duration. A desire becomes a temptation when it impacts or enters the individual's area of self-control, if the behavior resulting from the desire conflicts with an individual's values or other self-regulatory goals. A limitation to research on desire is the issue of individuals desiring different things. New research looked at what people desire in real world settings. Over one week, 7,827 self-reports of desires were collected and indicated significant differences in desire frequency and strength, degree of conflict between desires and other goals, and the likelihood of resisting desire and success of the resistance. The most common and strongly experienced desires are those related to bodily needs like eating, drinking, and sleeping.

Desires that conflict with overarching goals or values are known as temptations. Self-control dilemmas occur when long-term goals and values clash with short-term temptations. Counteractive Self-Control Theory states that when presented with such a dilemma, we lessen the significance of the instant rewards while momentarily increasing the importance of our overall values. When asked to rate the perceived appeal of different snacks before making a decision, people valued health bars over chocolate bars. However, when asked to do the rankings after having chosen a snack, there was no significant difference of appeal. Further, when college students completed a questionnaire prior to their course registration deadline, they ranked leisure activities as less important and enjoyable than when they filled out the survey after the deadline passed. The stronger and more available the temptation is, the harsher the devaluation will be.

One of the most common self-control dilemmas involves the desire for unhealthy or unneeded food consumption versus the desire to maintain long-term health. An indication of unneeded food could also be over expenditure on certain types of consumption such as eating away from home. Not knowing how much to spend, or overspending one's budget on eating out can be a symptom of a lack of self control.

Experiment participants rated a new snack as significantly less healthy when it was described as very tasty compared to when they heard it was just slightly tasty. Without knowing anything else about a food, the mere suggestion of good taste triggers counteractive self-control and prompted them to devalue the temptation in the name of health. Further, when presented with the strong temptation of one large bowl of chips, participants both perceived the chips to be higher in calories and ate less of them than did participants who faced the weak temptation of three smaller chip bowls, even though both conditions represented the same amount of chips overall.

Weak temptations are falsely perceived to be less unhealthy, so self-control is not triggered and desirable actions are more often engaged in, supporting the counteractive self-control theory.  Weak temptations present more of a challenge to overcome than strong temptations, because they appear less likely to compromise long-term values.

Satiation
The decrease in an individual's liking of and desire for a substance following repeated consumption of that substance is known as satiation. Satiation rates when eating depend on interactions of trait self-control and healthiness of the food.

After eating equal amounts of either clearly healthy (raisins and peanuts) or unhealthy (M&Ms and Skittles) snack foods, people who scored higher on trait self-control tests reported feeling significantly less desire to eat more of the unhealthy foods than they did the healthy foods. Those with low trait self-control satiated at the same pace regardless of health value. Further, when reading a description emphasizing the sweet flavor of their snack, participants with higher trait self-control reported a decrease in desire faster than they did after hearing a description of the healthy benefits of their snack. Once again, those with low self-control satiated at the same rate regardless of health condition. Perceived unhealthiness of the food alone, regardless of actual health level, relates to faster satiation, but only for people with high trait self-control.

Construal levels
Thinking that is characterized by high
construals, whenever individuals "are obliged to infer additional details of content, context, or meaning in the actions and outcomes that unfold around them", will view goals and values in a global, abstract sense.  Whereas low level construals emphasize concrete, definitive ideas and categorizations. Different construal levels determine our activation of self-control in response to temptations.

One technique for inducing high-level construals is asking an individual a series of "why?" questions that will lead to increasingly abstracted responses, whereas low-level construals are induced by "how?" questions leading to increasingly concrete answers. When taking an Implicit Association Test, people with induced high-level construals are significantly faster at associating temptations (such as candy bars) with "bad," and healthy choices (such as apples) with "good" than those in the low-level condition.  Further, higher-level construals also show a significantly increased likelihood of choosing an apple for snack over a candy bar. Without any conscious or active self-control efforts, temptations can be dampened by merely inducing high-level construals. It is suggested that the abstraction of high-level construals reminds people of their overall, lifelong values, such as a healthy lifestyle, which deemphasizes the current tempting situation.

Human and non-human
Positive correlation between linguistic capability and self-control has been inferred from experiments with common chimpanzees.

Human self-control research is typically  modeled by using a token economy system. A token economy system is a behavioral program in which individuals in a group can earn tokens for a variety of desirable behaviors and can cash in the tokens for various backup, positive reinforcers. The difference in research methodologies with humans - using tokens or conditioned reinforcers versus non-humans using sub-primary forces suggested procedural artifacts as a possible suspect. One aspect of these procedural differences was the delay to the exchange period. Non-human subjects can and most likely would access their reinforcement immediately. The human subjects had to wait for an "exchange period" in which they could exchange their tokens for money, usually at the end of the experiment. When this was done with the non-human subjects, in the form of pigeons, they responded much like humans in that males showed much less control than females.

Logue, (1995), who is discussed more below, points out that in her study done on self-control it was male children who responded with less self-control than female children.  She then states, that in adulthood, for the most part, the sexes equalize on their ability to exhibit self-control. This could imply a human's ability to exert more self-control as they mature and become aware of the consequences associated with impulsivity. This suggestion is further examined below.

Most of the research in the field of self-control assumes that self-control is in general better than impulsiveness. As a result, almost all research done on this topic is from this standpoint and very rarely is impulsiveness the more adaptive response in experimental design.

Self-control is a measurable variable in humans. In the worst circumstances people with the most or high self-control and resilience have the best odds of defying the odds they are faced with, which could be poverty, bad schooling, unsafe communities, etc. Those at a disadvantage with high self-control go on to higher education and professional jobs, but this, apparently,  seems to have a negative effect on their health.

When looking at people who come from advantaged backgrounds with high self-control, we see a different phenomenon happening. Those who come from an advantaged background tend to be high-achieving and with their achievement comes good health. The psychological phenomenon known as “John Henryism” posits that when goal-oriented, success-minded people strive ceaselessly in the absence of adequate support and resources, they can—like the mighty 19th-century folk legend who fell dead of an aneurysm after besting a steam-powered drill in a railroad-spike-driving competition—work themselves to death. Or, at least, toward it. In the 1980s, Sherman James, a socio-epidemiologist from North Carolina, found that black Americans in the state suffered disproportionately from heart disease and strokes. He too landed on "John Henryism" as the cause of this phenomenon.

More recently, some in the field of developmental psychology have begun to think of self-control in a more complicated way that takes into account that sometimes impulsiveness is the more adaptive response. In their view, a normal individual should have the capacity to be either impulsive or controlled depending on which is the most adaptive. However, this is a recent shift in paradigm and there is little research conducted along these lines.

Alternatives

Self control: Psychologist David DeSteno says research shows that using compassion, gratitude, and healthy pride to create positive emotional motivation can be less stressful, less vulnerable to rationalization, and more likely to be succeed than the traditional strategy of using logic and willpower to suppress behavior that resonates emotionally.

Skinner's survey of techniques 

B.F. Skinner's Science and Human Behavior provides a survey of nine categories of self-control methods.

Physical restraint and physical aid 

The manipulation of the environment to make some responses easier to physically execute and others more difficult illustrate this principle. This can be referred to as physical guidance which is the application of physical contact to induce an individual to go through the motions of a desired behavior. This concept can also be referred to as a physical prompt. Examples of this include clapping one's hand over one's own mouth, placing one's hand in one's pocket to prevent fidgeting, and using a ‘bridge’ hand position to steady a pool shot all represent physical methods to affect behavior.

Changing the stimulus 

Manipulating the occasion for behavior may change behavior as well. Removing distractions that induce undesired actions or adding a prompt to induce it are examples. Hiding temptation and reminders are two more. The need to hide temptation is a result of its effect on the mind. A common theme among studies of desire is an investigation of the underlying cognitive processes of a craving for an addictive substance, such as nicotine or alcohol. In order to better understand the cognitive processes involved, the Elaborated Intrusion (EI) theory of craving was developed. According to theory, craving persists because individuals develop mental images of the coveted substance that are instantly pleasurable, but which also increase their awareness of deficit. The result is a cruel circle of desire, imagery, and preparation to satisfy the desire. This quickly escalates into greater expression of the imagery that incorporates working memory, interferes with performance on simultaneous cognitive tasks, and strengthens the emotional response. Essentially the mind is consumed by the craving for a desired substance, and this craving in turn interrupts any concurrent cognitive tasks. Obviously a craving for nicotine or alcohol is an extreme case, but nevertheless the EI theory holds true for more normal motivations and desires.

Depriving and satiating 
Deprivation is the time in which an individual does not receive a reinforcer, while satiation occurs when an individual has received a reinforcer to such a degree that it will temporarily have no reinforcing power over them. If we deprive ourselves of a stimulus, the value of that reinforcement increases. For example, if an individual has been deprived of food, they may go to extreme measures to get that food, such as stealing. On the other hand, when we have an exceeding amount of a reinforcer, that reinforcement loses its value; if an individual eats a large meal, they may no longer be enticed by the reinforcement of dessert.

One may manipulate one's own behavior by affecting states of deprivation or satiation. By skipping a meal before a free dinner one may more effectively capitalize on the free meal. By eating a healthy snack beforehand the temptation to eat free "junk food" is reduced.

Also noteworthy is the importance of imagery in desire cognition during a state of deprivation. A study conducted on this topic involved smokers divided into two groups. The control group was instructed to continue smoking as usual until they arrived at the laboratory, where they were then asked to read a multisensory neutral script, meaning it was not related to a craving for nicotine. The experimental group, however, was asked to abstain from smoking before coming to the laboratory in order to induce craving and upon their arrival were told to read a multisensory urge-induction script intended to intensify their nicotine craving. Once the participants finished reading the script they rated their craving for cigarettes. Next they formulated visual or auditory images when prompted with verbal cues such as "a game of tennis" or "a telephone ringing." After this task the participants again rated their craving for cigarettes. The study found that the craving experienced by the abstaining smokers was decreased to the control group's level by visual imagery but not by auditory imagery alone. That mental imagery served to reduce the level of craving in smokers illustrates that it can be used as a method of self-control during times of deprivation.

Manipulating emotional conditions 

We manipulate emotional conditions in order to induce certain ways of responding. One example of this can be seen in theatre. Actors often elicit tears from painful memories if it is necessary for the character they are playing. This idea is similar to the notion if we read a letter, book, listen to music, watch a movie, in order to get us in the "mood" so we can be in the proper state of mind for a certain event or function. Additionally, treating an activity as "work" or "fun" can have an effect on the difficulty of self-control.

In order to analyze the possible effects of the cognitive transformation of an object on desire, a study was conducted based on a well-known German chocolate product. The study involved 71 undergraduate students, all of whom were familiar with the chocolate product. The participants were randomly assigned to one of three groups: the control condition, the consummatory condition, and the nonconsummatory transformation condition. Each group was then given three minutes to complete their assigned task. The participants in the control condition were told to read a neutral article about a location in South America that was devoid of any words associated with food consumption. Those in the consummatory condition were instructed to imagine as clearly as possible how consuming the chocolate would taste and feel. The participants in the nonconsummatory transformation condition were told to imagine as clearly as possible odd settings or uses for the chocolate. Next, all the participants underwent a manipulation task that required them to rate their mood on a five-point scale in response to ten items they viewed. Following the manipulation task, participants completed automatic evaluations that measured their reaction time to six different images of the chocolate, each of which was paired with a positive or a negative stimuli. The results showed that the participants instructed to imagine the consumption of the chocolate demonstrated higher automatic evaluations toward the chocolate than did the participants told to imagine odd settings or uses for the chocolate, and participants in the control condition fell in-between the two experimental conditions. This indicates that the manner in which one considers an item influences how much it is desired.

Using aversive stimulation 

Aversive stimulation is used as a means of increasing or decreasing the likelihood of target behavior. Similar to all methods of self-management,  there is a controlling response, and a controlled response. An averse stimuli is sometimes referred to as a punisher or simply an aversive. Closely related to the idea of a punisher is the concept of punishment. Punishment is the idea that in a given situation, someone does something that is immediately followed by a punisher, then that person is less likely to do the same thing again when she or he next encounters a similar situation. An example of this can be seen when a teenager stays out past curfew. After staying out past curfew, the teenager's parents ground the teenager. Because the teenager has been punished for his or her behavior he or she is less likely to stay out past their curfew again, thus decreasing the likelihood of the target behavior.

Drugs 

Certain types of drugs improve self-control. Stimulants, such as methylphenidate and amphetamine, improve inhibitory control in general and are used to treat ADHD. Similarly, depressants, such as alcohol, represent barriers to self-control through sluggishness, slower brain function, poor concentration, depression and disorientation.

Operant conditioning 

Operant conditioning sometimes referred to as Skinnerian conditioning is the process of strengthening a behavior by reinforcing it or weakening it by punishing it. By continually strengthening and reinforcing a behavior, or weakening and punishing a behavior an association as well as a consequence is made. Similarly, a behavior that is altered by its consequences is known as operant behavior.  There are multiple components of operant conditioning; these include reinforcement such as positive reinforcers and negative reinforcers. A positive reinforcer is a stimulus which, when presented immediately following a behavior, causes the behavior to increase in frequency. Negative reinforcers are a stimulus whose removal immediately after a response cause the response to be strengthened or to increase in frequency. Additionally, components of punishment are also incorporated such as positive punishment and negative punishment. Examples of operant conditioning can be seen every day. When a student tells a joke to one of his peers and they all laugh at this joke, this student is more likely to continue this behavior of telling jokes because his joke was reinforced by the sound of their laughing. However, if a peer tells the student his joke is "silly" or "stupid", he will be punished by telling the joke and his likelihood to tell another joke is greatly decreased.

Punishment 

Self-punishment of responses would include the arranging of punishment contingent upon undesired responses. This might be seen in the behavior of whipping oneself which some monks and religious persons do. This is different from aversive stimulation in that, for example, the alarm clock generates escape from the alarm, while self-punishment presents stimulation after the fact to reduce the probability of future behavior.

Punishment is more like conformity than self-control because with self-control there needs to be an internal drive, not an external source of punishment that makes the person want to do something. There is external locus of control which is similar to "determinism" and there is internal locus of control which is similar to "free will." With a learning system of punishment the person does not make their decision based upon what they want, rather they base it on the external factors. When you use a negative reinforcement you are more likely to influence their internal decisions and allow them to make the choice on their own whereas with a punishment the person will make their decisions based upon the consequences and not exert self-control. The best way to learn self-control is with "free will" where people are able to perceive they are making their own choices.

"Doing something else" 

Skinner noted that various philosophies and religions exemplified this principle by instructing believers to love their enemies. When we are filled with rage or hatred we might control ourselves by "doing something else" or more specifically something that is incompatible with our response.

Brain regions involved
Functional imaging of the brain has shown that self-control is correlated with an area in the dorsolateral prefrontal cortex (dlPFC), a part of the frontal lobe.  This area is distinct from those involved in generating intentional actions, attention to intentions, or select between alternatives. This control occurs through the  top-down inhibition of premotor cortex. There is some debate about the mechanism of self-control and how it emerges. Traditionally, researchers believed the bottom-up approach guided self-control behavior. The more time a person spends thinking about a rewarding stimulus, the more likely he or she will experience a desire for it. Information that is most important gains control of working memory, and can then be processed through a top-down mechanism. Increasing evidence suggests that top down processing plays a strong role in self-control. Specifically, top-down processing can actually regulate bottom-up attentional mechanisms. To demonstrate this, researchers studied working memory and distraction by presenting participants with neutral or negative pictures and then a math problem or no task. They found that participants reported less negative moods after solving the math problem compared to the no task group, which was due to an influence on working memory capacity.

There are many researchers working on identifying the brain areas involved in the exertion of self-control; many different areas are known to be involved. In relation to self-control mechanisms, the reward centers in the brain compare external stimuli versus internal need states and a person's learning history. At the biological level, a loss of control is thought to be caused by a malfunctioning of a decision mechanism. A mechanistic explanation of self-control is still in its infancy. However, there is strong demand for knowledge about these mechanism because knowledge of these mechanisms would have tremendous clinical application.
Much of the work on how the brain reaches decisions is based on evidence from perceptual learning.

Many of the tasks that subjects are tested on are not tasks typically associated with self-control, but are more general decision tasks. Nevertheless, the research on self-control is informed by more general research on decision tasks. Sources for evidence on the neural mechanisms of self-control include fMRI studies on human subject, neural recordings on animals, lesion studies on humans and animals, and clinical behavioral studies on humans with self-control disorders.

There is broad agreement that the cortex is involved in self-control. The details of the final model have yet to be worked out. However, there are some enticing findings that suggest a mechanistic account of self-control could prove to have tremendous explanatory value. What follows is a survey of some of the important recent literature on the brain regions involved in self-control.

Prefrontal cortex

The prefrontal cortex is located in the most anterior portion of the frontal lobe in the brain. It forms a larger portion of the cortex in humans. The dendrites in the prefrontal cortex contain up to 16 times as many dendritic spines as neurons in other cortical areas. Due to this, the prefrontal cortex integrates a large amount of information. The orbitofrontal cortex cells are important factors for self-control. If an individual has the choice between an immediate reward or a more valuable reward which they can receive later, an individual would most likely try to control the impulse to take that immediate reward. If an individual has a damaged orbitofrontal cortex, this impulse control will most likely not be as strong, and they may be more likely to take the immediate reinforcement. Additionally, we see lack of impulse control in children because the prefrontal cortex develops slowly.

Todd A. Hare et al. use functional MRI techniques to show that the ventromedial prefrontal cortex (vmPFC) and the dorsolateral prefrontal cortex (DLPFC) are crucially involved in the exertion of self-control. They found that activity in the vmPFC was correlated with goal values and that the exertion of self-control required the modulation of the vmPFC by the DLPFC. The study found that a lack of self-control was strongly correlated with reduced activity in the DLPFC. Hare's study is especially relevant to the self-control literature because it suggests that an important cause of poor self-control is a defective DLPFC.

Outcomes as determining whether a choice is made

Alexandra W. Logue is interested in how outcomes change the possibilities of a self-control choice being made.  Logue identifies three possible outcome effects: outcome delays, outcome size, and outcome contingencies.  The delay of an outcome results in the perception that the outcome is less valuable than an outcome which is more readily achieved. The devaluing of the delayed outcome can cause less self-control.  A way to increase self-control in situations of a delayed outcome is to pre-expose an outcome. Pre-exposure reduces the frustrations related to the delay of the outcome. An example of this is signing bonuses.

Outcome size deals with the relative, perceived size of possible outcomes.  There tends to be a relationship between the value of the incentive and the desired outcome; the larger the desired outcome, the larger the value.  Some factors that decrease value include delay, effort/cost, and uncertainty. The decision tends to be based on the option with the higher value at the time of the decision.

Finally, Logue defines the relationship between responses and outcomes as outcome contingencies.  Outcome contingencies also impact the degree of self-control that a person exercises.  For instance, if a person is able to change his choice after the initial choice is made, the person is far more likely to take the impulsive, rather than self-controlled, choice.  Additionally, it is possible for people to make precommitment action.  A precommitment action is an action meant to lead to a self-controlled action at a later period in time.  When a person sets an alarm clock, they are making a precommitted response to wake up early in the morning.  Hence, that person is more likely to exercise the self-controlled decision to wake up, rather than to fall back in bed for a little more sleep.

Cassandra B. Whyte studied locus of control and academic performance and determined that internals tend to achieve at a higher level.  Internals may perceive they have options from which to choose, thus facilitating more hopeful decision-making behavior as opposed to dependence on externally determined outcomes that require less commitment, effort, or self-control.

Physiology of behavior

Many things affect one's ability to exert self-control, but it seems that self-control requires sufficient glucose levels in the brain. Exerting self-control depletes glucose. Reduced glucose, and poor glucose tolerance (reduced ability to transport glucose to the brain) are correlated with lower performance in tests of self-control, particularly in difficult new situations. Self-control demands that an individual work to overcome thoughts, emotions, and automatic responses/impulses. These strong efforts require higher blood glucose levels. Lower blood glucose levels can lead to unsuccessful self-control abilities. Alcohol causes a decrease of glucose levels in both the brain and the body, and it also has an impairing effect on many forms of self-control. Furthermore, failure of self-control occurs most likely during times of the day when glucose is used least effectively. Self-control thus appears highly susceptible to glucose.

An alternative explanation of the limited amounts of glucose that are found is that this depends on the allocation of glucose, not on limited supply of glucose. According to this theory, the brain has sufficient resources of glucose and also has the possibility of delivering the glucose, but the personal priorities and motivations of the individual cause the glucose to be allocated to other sites. This theory has not been tested yet.

"The Marshmallow Test" 
In the 1960s, Walter Mischel tested four-year-old children for self-control in "The Marshmallow Test": the children were each given a marshmallow and told that they can eat it anytime they want, but if they waited 15 minutes, they would receive another marshmallow. Follow up studies showed that the results correlated well with these children's success levels in later life.

A strategy used in the marshmallow test was the focus on "hot" and "cool" features of an object. The children were encouraged to think about the marshmallow's "cool features" such as its shape and texture, possibly comparing it to a cotton ball or a cloud. The "hot features" of the marshmallow would be its sweet, sticky tastiness. These hot features make it more difficult to delay gratification. By focusing on the cool features, the mind is adverted from the appealing aspects of the marshmallow, and self-control is more plausible.

Years later Dr. Mischel reached out to the participants of his study who were then in their 40s. He found that those who showed less self-control by taking the single marshmallow in the initial study were more likely to develop problems with relationships, stress, and drug abuse later in life. Dr. Mischel carried out the experiment again with the same participants in order to see which parts of the brain were active during the process of self-control. The participants received scans through M.R.I to show brain activity. The results showed that those who exhibited lower levels of self-control had higher brain activity in the ventral striatum, the area that deals with positive rewards.

Reviews concluded that self-control is correlated with various positive life outcomes, such as happiness, adjustment and various positive psychological factors.  Self-control was also negatively correlated with sociotropy which in turn is correlated with depression.

Ego depletion 

Ego depletion is the view that high self-control requires energy and focus, and over an extended period of self-control demands, this self-control can lessen. There are ways to help this ego depletion. One way is through rest and relaxation from these high demands. Additionally, training self-control with certain behaviors may also help to strengthen an individual's self-control, as may motivational incentives and supplementation of glucose. Training on self-control tasks such as improving posture and monitoring eating habits might help boost willpower. This may be particularly effective in those who would otherwise have difficulty controlling their impulses.

However, there is conflicting evidence about whether ego depletion is a real effect; later meta-analyses have mostly found no evidence that the effect exists. For more details, see the main ego depletion page.

See also

References

Further reading

External links 

 Discipline in our life (religious tract)
 Teaching Children the Art of Self-Control

 
Motivation
Self
Autonomy
Virtue
Justice
Honor